Dr. Thomas Fillebrown (January 13, 1836 – January 22, 1908) was an American dentist and the head of the American Dental Association from 1897–1898.

Life 
Dr. Fillebrown was born in Winthrop, Maine. He was son of Dr. James Bowdoin and Almira Fillerbrown. He attended Towle Academy and Mount Weslyn Seminary from which he graduated in 1859. He began his career as teacher in a Public School and then began helping his father J. B. Fillebrown, who was a dentist himself. Thomas Fillebrown was a dentist and a professor of dentistry at Harvard University from 1883-1904. He was a successful oral surgeon and performed operations to fix cleft palates. He held a degree in dentistry from Harvard School of Dental Medicine, obtained in 1869. He was part of the first graduating class of Harvard Dental School. He also obtained a medical degree from Bowdoin College in 1863.

He wrote a textbook called Textbook on Operative Dentistry. He was married to Helen Dalton. They had children Edith, Harriet, Helen and Winthrop. Dr. Fillebrown wrote many articles on the subject of Oral Surgery, Hare-lip, cleft-palate, hypnosis of dental obtundant and anesthesia. After the merging of the American Dental Association and Southern Dental Association, he became the first president of the National Dental Association in 1897.

At the time of his death Fillebrown was serving as president of the American Academy of Dental Science.

Awards and positions 
 National Dental Association - President (1897)
 American Academy of Dental Science - President
 Maine State Dental Association - President (1907)
 Harvard Dental Alumni Association - President (1871-1874)
 Harvard School of Dental Medicine - Professor (1883-1904)

Sources
The Journal of The Allied Dental Societies, p. 101-113
Hyamson, Albert Montefiore. A Dictionary of Universal Biography of All ages and all people. p. 211.

External links
 
 

1836 births
Harvard School of Dental Medicine alumni
Medical School of Maine alumni
Harvard University faculty
1908 deaths
Physicians from Maine
People from Winthrop, Maine